The Central Drug Research Institute is a multidisciplinary research laboratory in Lucknow, India, employing scientific personnel from various areas of biomedical sciences. Prof. Tapas Kumar Kundu, a molecular biologist, academician and recipient of coveted Shanti Swarup Bhatnagar Prize for Science and Technology award, is the incumbent director of the Central Drug Research Institute.

History 
The Central Drug Research Institute was one of the first laboratories to be established in India right after its independence. It is among the thirty nine laboratories that are functioning under the aegis of the Council of Scientific and Industrial Research of India. The research institute was formally inaugurated on 17 February 1951 by the prime minister, Jawahar Lal Nehru.

Divisions 
For administrative and scientific purposes the institute's manpower has been grouped into 17 research and development divisions and several divisions providing technical and scientific support. The following divisions of are involved in research and development:
 Division of Biochemistry
 Division of Botany
 Clinical and Experimental Medicine
 Division of Cancer Biology
 Division of Endocrinology
 Fermentation Technology
 Medicinal and Process Chemistry
 Division of Microbiology
 Division of Neuroscience and Aging Biology 
 Division of Parasitology
 Division of Pharmaceutics
 Division of Pharmacokinetics and Metabolism
 Division of Pharmacology
 Division of Toxicology
 Division of Laboratory Animals

In addition, two data centers and one field station located outside the research institute provide operational support.

Achievements

 Centchroman/Ormeloxifene

References

External links

Council of Scientific and Industrial Research
Ministry of Health and Family Welfare
Pharmaceutical research institutes
Research institutes in Lucknow
Research institutes in Uttar Pradesh
1951 establishments in Uttar Pradesh
Research institutes established in 1951
Pharmaceutical industry of India
Pharmacy colleges in Uttar Pradesh